Software Advice is a company that provides advisory services, research, and user reviews on software applications for businesses in over 300 market categories including medical, CRM, HR, construction, business intelligence and marketing automation.

Co-founded in 2005 by CEO Don Fornes and Austin Merritt, it has been a subsidiary of Gartner since 2014.

History 
Software Advice, Inc., formerly known as River Guide, Inc., was co-founded in 2005 in San Francisco, California by CEO Don Fornes and Austin Merritt, the company's former general manager and COO. The company provides advice on different software for buyers in several verticals: construction, medical, retail, property, manufacturing, distribution, electronic health record, CRM, applicant tracking systems, and more. In 2009, the company's headquarters moved to its current location in Austin, Texas. In March 2014, Software Advice was acquired by Gartner, Inc., a global information technology research and advisory company.

The company announced Blake Clark as its new general manager in November 2018.

Product
The company advises buyers on software products via free telephone consultations with software analysts. The Software Advice website gives pricing and demo information on individual systems, as well as market reports based on buyer interactions, and detailed reviews and comparisons.  The company's reports have been used as a source of expertise in Forbes, Entrepreneur, Huffington Post, Business Insider, Yelp, Inc., and the Wall Street Journal among others.

Software Advice releases biannual reports to highlight top software products in different categories.  Its FrontRunners for Enterprise Resource Planning (ERP), April 2019 report analyzed the software that companies use to track information such as inventory management, accounting, and customer relationship management. In the report, Software Advice used analyzed data to plot the market’s top ERP products graphically, based on Usability and User Recommended. The other FrontRunners reports also base scores on Usability and User Recommended.

Recognition
In 2013, Software Advice was recognized as one of the fastest-growing companies in the U.S. by Inc. Magazine.

In 2016 and 2017, the company was recognized as a Top Place to Work in the Austin, Texas area.

References

Information technology consulting firms of the United States
Companies based in Austin, Texas
Software companies established in 2005